Simakovo is a rural locality (a village) in Vakhromeyevskoye Rural Settlement, Kameshkovsky District, Vladimir Oblast, Russia. The population was 118 as of 2010.

Geography 
Simakovo is located 15 km north of Kameshkovo (the district's administrative centre) by road. Imeni Krasina is the nearest rural locality.

References 

Rural localities in Kameshkovsky District